Tyler Nathan Blackett (born 2 April 1994) is an English professional footballer who plays for Rotherham United as a left-back or centre-back. He began his career in the Manchester United youth academy in 2002, and has played on loan for Blackpool, Birmingham City and Celtic in the past. Born in Manchester, he is qualified to play for England, Barbados or Jamaica internationally.

Club career

Manchester United
Blackett began his football career with youth club Fletcher Moss Rangers, and signed for Manchester United in 2002 at the age of 8. He signed a professional contract with United in July 2012.

Blackpool (loan)
On 1 November 2013, Blackett signed for Championship club Blackpool on a month-long loan. The next day, he made his debut for the Seasiders, playing the whole 90 minutes in a 1–0 league win at Nottingham Forest. On 5 December 2013, Blackpool extended Blackett's loan until 1 January 2014.

Birmingham City (loan) 
On 31 January 2014, Blackett signed for Championship club Birmingham City on a youth loan until the end of the season. Together with fellow Manchester United loanee Tom Thorpe, Blackett started the next day's match, at home to Derby County. After 38 minutes, he tripped Will Hughes to concede a penalty, which Darren Randolph saved. Birmingham came back from 3–1 down to draw, the equaliser scored by a third United loanee, Federico Macheda, in stoppage time.

2014–15 season: Return to United 
During the 2014–15 pre-season, Blackett played at centre-back for Manchester United in a 3–5–2 formation and his performances led to him earning praise from new manager Louis van Gaal. In the club's final pre-season match against Valencia at Old Trafford, he provided the assist for Marouane Fellaini's stoppage-time winner to make the score 2–1.

As a result of an injury crisis and the departure of experienced defenders Rio Ferdinand and Nemanja Vidić from the club, Blackett was drafted into the first team squad on a permanent basis. Blackett made his competitive debut for Manchester United on 16 August 2014, in the first match of the 2014–15 Premier League season, playing the full 90 minutes and being booked in a 2–1 home defeat to Swansea City in Van Gaal's first competitive match as Manchester United manager. He also played in the next game away at Sunderland, which ended in a 1–1 draw with Blackett making an important clearance during the match to help earn Manchester United a point. Blackett also played in the 0–0 draw against Burnley on 30 August 2014. During the game he received a yellow card for a mistimed challenge. Blackett then played in United's first win of the season when they beat Queens Park Rangers 4–0 as a centre-back rather than a full-back. He was sent off in the 82nd minute on 21 September as United lost 5–3 at Leicester City.

On 17 May 2015 in a home match against Arsenal, Blackett came on in place of Marcos Rojo after 73 minutes, and nine minutes later deflected a Theo Walcott cross for an own goal past United goalkeeper Victor Valdés to cause a 1–1 draw. In total, Blackett made 12 Premier League appearances during the 2014–15 season.

Celtic (loan) 
On 29 August 2015, Blackett was loaned to Scottish Premiership club Celtic until the end of the 2015–16 season. He made his debut playing at left-back in a league match at Aberdeen on 12 September 2015, but Celtic lost 2–1 to the league leaders. Blackett dropped out of the side for a few matches, but returned on 4 October for a league match at Hamilton Accies, taking the place of the suspended Efe Ambrose in central defence and helped Celtic to a 2–1 win.

Reading
On 22 August 2016, Blackett signed a four-year contract with Championship club Reading. Head coach Jaap Stam, a former Manchester United player, praised the defender for his versatility and attacking presence.

With his contract with Reading due to expire on 30 June 2020, and due to the effects of the COVID-19 pandemic on the 2019–20 season, Blackett signed a short-term extension with Reading until the end of the season. Following the completion of the 2019–20 season, Reading announced that Blackett would leave the club at the end of July 2020.

Nottingham Forest 
On 15 August 2020, Blackett joined Nottingham Forest on a permanent contract. He made his debut for the club on 12 September, starting in a 2–0 defeat away to Queens Park Rangers.

FC Cincinnati 
On 6 August 2021, Blackett joined Major League Soccer club FC Cincinnati on a free transfer. Blackett was released by Cincinnati following their 2022 season.

Rotherham United
On 8 March 2023, Blackett returned to England when he joined Championship club Rotherham United on a short-term contract until the end of the season.

International career

Background
Blackett qualifies to play for England, Barbados or Jamaica internationally and has represented England at various youth levels.

England Under-16s
In September 2009, Blackett was called up to the England U16 squad for the 2009 Victory Shield match against Wales. On 15 October, he started the 1–0 win against Wales, but was replaced by Alex Henshall a few minutes before half-time. Blackett was recalled to the squad for the final Victory Shield match against Scotland in November 2009; he replaced Sam Magri in the 69th minute as England won 2–1 at the Tynecastle Stadium in Edinburgh. The victory sealed England's ninth consecutive Victory Shield.

England Under-17s
Blackett was called up to the England U17 squad for the Algarve Tournament in February 2011. He started England's opening game of the tournament on 24 February, playing the full 90 minutes in a 1–1 draw with Romania. He was an unused substitute in the 3–1 defeat against Germany, but came on to replace Alex Henshall in the 76th minute of the 2–2 draw with Portugal.

England Under-18s
In November 2011, Blackett was called up to the England U18 squad for a friendly against Slovakia. On 16 November, he started the 1–1 draw with Slovakia, before being replaced by Courtney Meppen-Walter in the 65th minute. He retained his place in the squad for the friendly against Poland in February 2012, coming on at half-time as England won 3–0 at the Alexandra Stadium.

England Under-19s
In August 2012, Blackett was called up to the England U19 squad for a friendly against Germany. On 6 September, he started the game in Hamburg, playing the whole 90 minutes as England lost 3–1. Blackett earned his second call up for a friendly with Denmark in January 2013, he started the game before being replaced by Lewis Baker in the 67th minute as England won 3–1 at the Keepmoat Stadium.

England Under-21s
In August 2014 Blackett received his first call up to the England U21 squad after becoming part of the Manchester United first team squad and starting the first two games of the season.

Career statistics

Club

Honours
Celtic
 Scottish Premiership: 2015-16

References

External links
 
 Tyler Blackett TheFA.com

Living people
1994 births
English footballers
Footballers from Manchester
Manchester United F.C. players
Association football fullbacks
England youth international footballers
Blackpool F.C. players
Birmingham City F.C. players
English Football League players
Premier League players
Black British sportspeople
English people of Jamaican descent
English people of Barbadian descent
England under-21 international footballers
Celtic F.C. players
Reading F.C. players
Nottingham Forest F.C. players
Fletcher Moss Rangers F.C. players
FC Cincinnati players
Rotherham United F.C. players
Scottish Professional Football League players
English expatriate footballers
English expatriate sportspeople in the United States
Expatriate soccer players in the United States
Major League Soccer players